Patrick Duggan, Dugan or Dougan may refer to:
Patrick Duggan (bishop) (1813–1896), Irish Roman Catholic clergyman
Patrick Duggan (actor) (1935–2022), Irish actor
Patrick Gerald Duggan or Patrick Malahide (born 1945), British actor
Patrick J. Duggan (1933–2020), U.S. federal judge
Patrick Dougan (born 1889), Scottish professional footballer

Fictional characters
Pat Dugan,  DC Comics Universe superhero